The following outline is provided as an overview of and topical guide to sports:

Sport – a physical activity that is governed by a set of rules or customs and often engaged in competitively, sports can be played on land, in water and in the air.

What is a sport?
Sports can be described as all of the following:
 Entertainment – Any sport that includes spectators, either free or paid admission, with no pre-scripted plot of the final outcome. The athletics might also get entertained by complete sports objective.
 Exercise – some sports are physical exercise while others are mental exercise.

Types of sports

 Amateur sports
 Animal sport
 Athletic sports
 Blood sports
 Demonstration sports
 Disabled sports
 Electronic sports
 Extreme sports
 Fantasy sports
 Individual sport
 Motorsports
 Professional sports
 Racing
 Spectator sport
 Team sport
 Throwing sports
 Underwater sports
 Women's sports
 Youth sports

List of sports

List of sports

Sport by region
Africa

West Africa 

 Benin • Burkina Faso • Cape Verde • Côte d'Ivoire • Gambia • Ghana • Guinea • Guinea-Bissau • Liberia • Mali • Mauritania • Niger • Nigeria • Senegal • Sierra Leone • Togo

North Africa 

 Algeria • Egypt • Libya • Mauritania • Morocco • Sudan • Tunisia • Western Sahara

Central Africa 

 Angola • Burundi • Cameroon • Central African Republic • Chad • The Democratic Republic of the Congo • Equatorial Guinea • Gabon • Republic of the Congo • Rwanda • São Tomé and Príncipe

East Africa 

 Burundi • Comoros • Djibouti • Eritrea • Ethiopia • Kenya • Madagascar • Malawi • Mauritius • Mozambique • Rwanda • Seychelles • Somalia • Tanzania • Uganda • Zambia • Zimbabwe

Southern Africa  

 Botswana • Eswatini • Lesotho • Namibia • South Africa  

Dependencies

 Mayotte (France)  • St. Helena (UK) • Puntland • Somaliland  • Sahrawi Arab Democratic Republic

Antarctica
 None

Asia
Central Asia
 Kazakhstan •  Kyrgyzstan •  Tajikistan •  Turkmenistan •  Uzbekistan
East Asia
 China
 Tibet

 Hong Kong •  Macau
 Japan •  North Korea •  South Korea •  Mongolia •  Taiwan
North Asia
 Russia
Southeast Asia
 Brunei •  Burma (Myanmar)  •  Cambodia •  East Timor (Timor-Leste) •  Indonesia •  Laos •  Malaysia •  Philippines •  Singapore •  Thailand •  Vietnam
South Asia
 Afghanistan •  Bangladesh •  Bhutan•  Iran •  Maldives •  Nepal •  Pakistan •  Sri Lanka

India
Delhi

West Asia
  Armenia •  Azerbaijan •  Bahrain •  Cyprus (including disputed Northern Cyprus) •  Georgia •  Iraq •  Israel •  Jordan •  Kuwait •  Lebanon •  Oman •  PalestineQatar •  Saudi Arabia •  Syria •  Turkey<ref>  Turkey is generally considered a transcontinental country in Western Asia and Southern Europe; population and area figures are for Asian portion only, excluding all of Istanbul.</small></ref> •  United Arab Emirates •  Yemen

Caucasus (a region considered to be in both Asia and Europe, or between them)

North Caucasus
 Parts of Russia (Chechnya, Ingushetia, Dagestan, Adyghea, Kabardino-Balkaria, Karachay–Cherkessia, North Ossetia, Krasnodar Krai, Stavropol Krai)

South Caucasus
 Georgia (including disputed Abkhazia, South Ossetia) • Armenia •   Azerbaijan (including disputed Nagorno-Karabakh Republic)

Europe
 Akrotiri and Dhekelia • Åland • Albania • Andorra • Armenia • Austria • Azerbaijan • Belarus • Belgium • Bosnia and Herzegovina • Bulgaria • Croatia • Cyprus • Czech Republic • Denmark • Estonia • Faroe Islands • Finland • France • Georgia • Germany • Gibraltar • Greece • Guernsey • Hungary • Iceland • Ireland • Isle of Man • Italy • Jersey • Kazakhstan • Kosovo • Latvia • Liechtenstein • Lithuania • Luxembourg • Macedonia • Malta • Moldova (including disputed Transnistria) • Monaco • Montenegro • Netherlands • Norway • Poland • Portugal • Romania • Russia • San Marino • Serbia • Slovakia • Slovenia • Spain • Svalbard • Sweden • Switzerland • Turkey • Ukraine
 United Kingdom
 England (Birmingham, Bristol, Cornwall, London, Milton Keynes, Sussex, Worthing) • Northern Ireland (Belfast) • Scotland (Glasgow) • Wales (Cardiff)
 Vatican City

 European Union

North America
Canada

 Greenland • Mexico • Saint Pierre and Miquelon

United States

 Alabama • Alaska • Arizona • Arkansas • California • Colorado • Connecticut • Delaware • Florida • Georgia • Hawaii • Idaho • Illinois • Indiana • Iowa • Montana • Kansas • Kentucky • Louisiana • Maine • Maryland • Massachusetts • Michigan • Minnesota • Mississippi • Missouri • Nebraska • Nevada • New Hampshire • New Jersey • New Mexico • New York • North Carolina • North Dakota • Ohio • Oklahoma • Oregon • Pennsylvania • Rhode Island • South Carolina • South Dakota • Tennessee • Texas • Utah • Vermont • Virginia • Washington • West Virginia • Wisconsin • Wyoming

 District of Columbia (Washington, D.C.)

Central America
 Belize • Costa Rica • El Salvador • Guatemala • Honduras • Nicaragua • Panama

Caribbean
 Anguilla • Antigua and Barbuda •  Aruba •  Bahamas •  Barbados •  Bermuda •  British Virgin Islands •  Cayman Islands •  Cuba •  Dominica •  Dominican Republic •  Grenada •  Haiti •  Jamaica •  Montserrat •  Netherlands Antilles •  Puerto Rico •  Saint Barthélemy •  Saint Kitts and Nevis •  Saint Lucia •  Saint Martin •  Saint Vincent and the Grenadines •  Trinidad and Tobago •  Turks and Caicos Islands •  United States Virgin Islands

Oceania (includes the continent of Australia)
Australasia
 Australia (Brisbane, Sydney)
Dependencies/Territories of Australia
 Christmas Island •  Cocos (Keeling) Islands •   Norfolk Island
 New Zealand
Melanesia
Fiji •  Indonesia (Oceanian part only) •  New Caledonia (France) •  Papua New Guinea •  Solomon Islands •  Vanuatu •
Micronesia
 Federated States of Micronesia •  Guam (US) •  Kiribati •  Marshall Islands •  Nauru •  Northern Mariana Islands (USA) •  Palau •  Wake Island (USA) •
Polynesia
 American Samoa (USA) •  Chatham Islands (NZ) •  Cook Islands (NZ) •  Easter Island (Chile) •  French Polynesia (France)  •  Hawaii (USA) •  Loyalty Islands (France) • Niue (NZ) •  Pitcairn Islands (UK) •  Adamstown •  Samoa •  Tokelau (NZ) •  Tonga •  Tuvalu •  Wallis and Futuna (France)

South America
 Argentina • Bolivia • Brazil • Chile • Colombia • Ecuador • Falkland Islands • Guyana • Paraguay • Peru • Suriname • Uruguay • Venezuela

South Atlantic

 Ascension Island •  Saint Helena • Tristan da Cunha

History of sports

History of sports

 Sports history organizations
 History of American football
 History of archery
 History of association football
 History of Australian rules football
 History of baseball
 History of basketball
 History of chess
 History of cricket
 History of cue sports
 History of curling
 History of cycling
 History of field hockey
 History of figure skating
 History of Formula One
 History of hang gliding
 History of the Gaelic Athletic Association
 History of hurling
 History of lacrosse
 History of martial arts
 History of netball
 History of orienteering
 History of professional wrestling
 History of rodeo
 History of roller derby
 History of rowing
 History of rugby league
 History of rugby union
 History of skiing
 History of snooker
 History of surfing
 History of swimming
 History of tennis
 History of water polo
 History of wrestling

Recreational sporting
 Sports game
 Fantasy sport

Rules
 Foul
 Goal
 Open
 Referee
 Score
 Sudden death
 Offside

Sports in court
General
 Court of Arbitration for Sport

American football
 American Needle, Inc. v. National Football League
 Two cases that involved the trademark rights of the Washington Redskins:
 Harjo et al v. Pro Football, Inc.
 Pro-Football, Inc. v. Harjo
 NCAA v. Board of Regents of the University of Oklahoma

Association football
 Bosman ruling
 Fraser v. Major League Soccer
 Webster ruling

Baseball
 Barry Bonds perjury case
 Federal Baseball Club v. National League
 Flood v. Kuhn
 Seitz decision
 Toolson v. New York Yankees

Basketball
 Haywood v. National Basketball Association
 Robertson v. National Basketball Association

Other sports
 Kolpak ruling

Sports training and nutrition

Muscles training

Sports nutrition

Sports medicine

Sports medicine
 Concussions in sport
 Sports injuries
 Sports drink
 Doping in sport
 List of doping cases in sport

Sports and media
 Broadcasting of sports events
 Sports Emmy Award
 List of sports films
 Sports journalism
 Sports radio
 World record

Sports magazines
 Sports Illustrated
 SportsEvents Magazine

Sports television programs
 Pulp Sport

Sports ethics and conduct
 Gamesmanship
 Racism in sport
 Sportsmanship
 Spirit of the Game in Ultimate
 Violence in sports
 Hooliganism
 Violence in baseball
 Violence in ice hockey

Sports participants

 Animals in sport
 Sport horse
 Athlete
 Coach
 Fan
 Scout
 Sports commentator
 Student athlete

Sports venues 

Sport venue

 Arena
 Association football pitch
 Australian rules football playing field
 Baseball park
 Billiard hall
 Cricket ground
 Game court
 Golf course
 Gym
 Gymkhana
 Ice hockey arena
 Ice rink
 Olympic-size swimming pool
 Race track
 Roller rink
 Rugby league playing field
 Speed skating rink
 Stadium
 Tennis court

Sports venue features 
 Bleacher
 Club seating
 Field house
 Grandstand
 Dohyō
 Groundshare
 Leisure centre
 Luxury box
 Medialuna
 Palace of Sports
 Palaestra
 Personal seat license
 Turf management

Sports equipment
 Floodlights
 Sports equipment
 Sportswear

Game play
 Power play
 Losing streak
 Grind

Sports management

Sport management
 Demonstration sport
 Sports marketing
 Sponsor
 Scout
 List of professional sports leagues by revenue

Sports culture
 Fan loyalty
 National sport
 Nudity in sport
 Performance art
 Sports memorabilia
 Sporting club
 List of sports attendance figures
 List of attendance figures at domestic professional sports leagues

Sports and politics

Politics and sports
 Nationalism and sport
 Ministry of Sports
 Racism in sport
 Sport policies of the Arab League
 Sport policies of the European Union

Sporting events
 Division
 International sport
 Multi-sport event
 National championship
 Olympic Games
 Sports league
 Tournament
 World championship
 List of professional sports leagues

Sports governing bodies

Sports governing body

 Regulation of sport

World governing bodies of various notable sports:
 The Olympic Games: International Olympic Committee (IOC)
 Baseball: International Baseball Federation (IBAF), but several countries/regions have their own professional bodies with rules variations, including Cuba, US/Canada, and Japan
 Basketball: FIBA (International Basketball Federation), but national pro leagues may diverge from its rules, as in the US
 Cricket: International Cricket Council (ICC)
 Cue sports: World Confederation of Billiards Sports:
 Carom billiards: Union Mondiale de Billard (UMB)
 Pocket billiards (pool): World Pool-Billiard Association (WPA)
 Snooker and English billiards: World Professional Billiards and Snooker Association (WPBSA or World Snooker)
 Football variants have many governing bodies, with widely divergent rules:
 Association football (soccer): FIFA
 Gridiron football is divided in into:
 American football: International Federation of American Football (IFAF) is the world governing body, but U.S. domestic leagues at professional and college levels may diverge from its rules 
 Canadian football: Canadian Football League (CFL)
 Rugby football is divided into two "codes" or sets of rules:
 Rugby league: Rugby League International Federation (RLIF)
 Rugby union: International Rugby Board (IRB)
 Australian rules football: AFL Commission
 Gaelic football: Gaelic Athletic Association (GAA)
 International-rules football: A conference of the AFL and GAA
 Golf: International Golf Federation (IGF)
 Ice hockey: International Ice Hockey Federation (IIHF)
 Motor racing:
 Car racing: International Federation of the Automobile (FIA)
 Motorcycle racing: International Motorcycling Federation (FIM)
 Motorboat racing: International Motonautical Union (UIM) and others, depending on boat type
 Tennis: International Tennis Federation (ITF)
 Underwater sports
 Confédération Mondiale des Activités Subaquatiques (CMAS)

Sociology of sport

The sociology of sport is a subfield of sociology which aims to study sports through the lens of interactions between different groups and cultures. The field has also investigated how various gender divides in sports can influence feminist movements.

Sport psychology

Sport psychology is the study of how psychological factors can impact engagement in professional and recreational sports, as well as how sports impact an athlete's psychological state. After becoming popular in the early 20th century, it is now a recognized scientific field which is relevant to many different sports. Modern sports psychologists often use a combination of goal setting, visualization techniques and preperformance routines to help athletes achieve their goals.

See also

Sports-related outlines

 Outline of association football
 Outline of auto racing
 Outline of baseball
 Outline of basketball
 Outline of bodybuilding
 Outline of bowling
 Outline of boxing
 Outline of canoeing and kayaking
 Outline of cue sports
 Outline of cycling
 Outline of exercise
 Outline of fencing
 Outline of floorball
 Outline of golf
 Outline of gridiron football
 Outline of gymnastics
 Outline of hockey
 Outline of lacrosse
 Outline of martial arts
 Outline of motorcycling
 Outline of the Olympics
 Outline of rugby
 Outline of rugby league
 Outline of skateboarding
 Outline of skiing
 Outline of softball
 Outline of sports car racing

References

External links

 Merriam-Webster dictionary entry
 Ancient Olympic Games
 Sport and apartheid

Sports
Sports
outline

pt:Anexo:Lista de desportos